Rathborne is a surname. Notable persons with the surname include:

 Aaron Rathborne (fl. 1605–1622), English surveyor
 Basil Rathbone (1892 – 1967), English actor
 Joseph Rathborne (1807 – 1842), English priest
 Luke Rathborne, musician
 St George Henry Rathborne (1854 - 1938), American writer